Founded in 1936, Mariemont Players is a community theatre company in Cincinnati, Ohio. Mariemont Players, Inc. (MPI) which were organized in 1960 stages 6 new performances including comedies, musicals, challenging mysteries and dramas a year. The president of the local community theater is Steve Winslow.

References

External links
 https://www.yelp.com/biz/mariemont-players-cincinnati-3
 https://behindthecurtaincincy.com/2016/10/06/mariemont-players-is-proud-to-announce-our-2017-2018-season/
 http://cincymagazine.com/Main/Articles/All_the_Worlds_a_Stage_The_Plays_the_Thing_for_Mar_3774.aspx
 Mariemont Players

Theatre companies in Cincinnati